Typhoon Conson, known in the Philippines as Typhoon Frank, was the first of the record ten typhoons to impact Japan during the 2004 Pacific typhoon season. Developing out of a tropical depression near the northern Philippines in early June, Conson slowly traveled towards the north. Gradually strengthening, the storm reached typhoon status late on June 7 according to the Joint Typhoon Warning Center and several hours later according to the Japan Meteorological Agency. After turning towards the northeast, the typhoon brushed Taiwan and reached its peak intensity with winds of  10-minute winds) on June 9. After reaching its peak, Conson gradually weakened, passing through Okinawa before being downgraded to a tropical storm the next day. On June 11, the storm made landfall as a minimal tropical storm in the Kōchi Prefecture just before becoming extratropical. The extratropical remnants continued towards the northeast and were last mentioned on June 14 crossing the International Date Line.

Typhoon Conson brought heavy rains and high winds to the Philippines, Taiwan, Okinawa, and Japan. Flooding in the Philippines killed two people and caused about PHP1.6 million (US$35,000) in damages. However, some reports state that up to 30 people died in the Philippines. In the Ryukyu Islands, the storm brought heavy rains and high winds to several islands, damaging crops and leaving many without power. As it became extratropical, Conson caused moderate damage in southern Japan, including a few landslides which prompted evacuations. Throughout Japan, losses reached 355.7 million yen (US$3.8 million).

Meteorological history 

Later that day, following notable development, they classified the system as Tropical Depression 07W. At the same time, the Japan Meteorological Agency (JMA) also began monitoring the system as a tropical depression. Slowly moving towards the southeast, 07W gradually strengthened, being classified a tropical storm by the JTWC at 1200 UTC the next day. Around the same time, the storm entered the Philippine Atmospheric, Geophysical and Astronomical Services Administration's area of responsibility and was given the local name Frank. Twenty-four hours later, 07W made its closest approach to the Philippines, passing within  of Manila. A few hours later, the JMA upgraded the depression to a tropical storm and gave it the name Conson; a name contributed by Vietnam that is a picturesque place in the country, consisting of a mountain, pine forest, streams, pagodas and many historical monuments.

A ridge located over the central Philippines caused Conson to turn towards the north. Continuing to intensify, the JTWC assessed the storm to have reached typhoon status at 1800 UTC on June 7. The JMA also upgraded the storm to a typhoon about twelve hours later. Originally, forecasts showed the typhoon making landfall in southern Taiwan but the turn towards the northeast spared the island from a direct hit. Shortly after being classified as a typhoon by the JMA, the JTWC upgraded Conson to a Category 2 typhoon on the Saffir–Simpson scale with winds of  1-minute winds). The eye later became slightly disorganized and the cloud tops around the center warmed. However, the storm reorganized the next day and was upgraded to a Category 3 typhoon by the JTWC with winds of  1-minute winds). The intensification was the result of the influence of an approaching shortwave trough which enhanced poleward outflow. Around this time, PAGASA issued their final advisory on Typhoon 'Frank' as it moved out of their area of responsibility.

The strengthening was the result of Conson passing over the warm waters of the Kuroshio Current. The forward motion on the typhoon also began to increase as it interacted with a baroclinic zone. Shortly after, the JMA assessed the storm to have reached its peak intensity with winds of  10-minute winds) and a minimum pressure of 960 hPa (mbar). Later that day, the storm passed over Okinawa as it weakened. By June 10, Conson began to undergo an extratropical transition. Continuing increase in forward speed caused the low to become exposed from shower and thunderstorm activity on the southern edge of the circulation. Around 1200 UTC, the center of circulation became separated from deep convection, leading to the typhoon being downgraded to a tropical storm by both agencies several hours later. Early on June 11, the JTWC reported that the storm had completed its extratropical transition just south of Japan. However, the JMA kept Conson has a tropical cyclone through its landfall in Kōchi Prefecture as a minimal tropical storm. Shortly after landfall, it was classified as an extratropical cyclone. Continuing towards the northeast, the storm remained weak and was last mentioned as it crossed the International Date Line on June 14 near the Aleutian Islands.

The Japan Meteorological Agency uses 10-minute sustained winds, while the Joint Typhoon Warning Center uses 1-minute sustained winds. The conversion factor between the two is 1.14x. JMA's peak intensity for Conson was  10-minute sustained, or  1-minute sustained. The JTWC's peak intensity for Conson was  1-minute sustained, or  10-minute sustained. The National Meteorological Center of China estimated a peak intensity of  10-minute sustained, or  1-minute sustained. The Hong Kong Observatory assessed Conson to be slightly weaker than other agencies, with peak winds estimated at  10-minute sustained, or  1-minute sustained.

Preparations and impact

Philippines 
On June 7, the Philippine Atmospheric, Geophysical and Astronomical Services Administration raised Public Storm Signal No. 1 for most of Luzon. As Conson strengthened into a typhoon, northern areas of Luzon were placed under Public Storm Signal No. 3, resulting in school closures. Minor flooding and power outages were reported in Manila. These heavy rains led to flooding which reportedly killed 30 people in Luzon. However, the fatalities are uncertain as PAGASA reported that two people were killed by the storm. In all, Conson caused about PHP1.6 million (US35,000) in damage.

Taiwan and Hong Kong 
High winds and heavy rain warnings were issued for most of Taiwan along with sea warnings. Schools and businesses on Orchid Island were suspended on June 9 and 10 as Typhoon Conson passed by. Some domestic flights were cancelled and rail and ferry services were suspended ahead of the storm. When Conson was first classified, Hong Kong was placed under a standby signal as the storm was located within  of the city Only a few showers were reported in the city due to the storm. Taiwanese officials checked water gates throughout the island on June 8 and found that 68 were missing. Water management officials stated that the missing gates could "...wreak unnecessary damage...". The following day, 42 of the missing gates had been replaced. Fishing boats returned to port for shelter during the storm. An emergency operations center was set up to carry out search and rescue missions during and following the typhoon. The storm caused minor damage and one minor injury during as it passed by Taiwan. Although Conson dropped heavy rains across the island, it was not enough to alleviate drought conditions in the southern areas.

Japan 

Traveling towards the northeast, Conson headed towards Okinawa where schools were closed and local transportation was disrupted due to the storm. The Japan Meteorological Agency warned residents about the threat of heavy rains and high winds resulting from the storm. A United States naval base located in Okinawa was placed under a Tropical Cyclone Condition of Readiness (TCCR) Four as Typhoon Conson was approaching. Ahead of the storm, upwards of  fell across the islands, which were indirectly related to the storm. In southern Japan, several airlines canceled flights due to poor weather conditions.

Despite transitioning into an extratropical cyclone while impacting Japan, Conson brought heavy rains and high winds to Kyūshū.

On Ishigaki Island, high winds and heavy rains cut power to many residences and damaged crops. Significant agricultural damage was also sustained on Miyako-jima, leaving 76.5 million yen (US$805,000) in losses. Okinawa sustained moderate damage during the passage of Conson, with several homes flooded and large lengths of power lines were lost. At the height of the storm, roughly 3,300 residences were without power and 1,305 power lines were downed. Additionally,  of agricultural land was damaged, leaving 32.3 million yen (US$350,000) in losses.

In Kagoshima Prefecture, Conson damaged  of agricultural land and flooded six homes. Agricultural and property damage in the prefecture amounted to 100 million yen (US$1 million) and 115 million yen (US$1.2 million) respectively. Throughout Kōchi Prefecture, several highways were shut down after being damaged by Conson. Over 20 schools were let out early due to the deteriorating conditions.

See also 

Tropical Storm Halong (2008)
Typhoon Chan-hom (2009)

References

External links 

JMA General Information of Typhoon Conson (0404) from Digital Typhoon
JMA Best Track Data of Typhoon Conson (0404) 
JMA Best Track Data (Graphics) of Typhoon Conson (0404)
JMA Best Track Data (Text)
JTWC Best Track Data of Typhoon 07W (Conson)
07W.CONSON from the U.S. Naval Research Laboratory

2004 Pacific typhoon season
Typhoons in Taiwan
Typhoons in Japan
F
F
Typhoon Conson
Typhoon Conson
Typhoons in China
2004 in Hong Kong
Typhoons
Tropical cyclones in 2004